Robert Leigh is a Canadian physicist working on string theory.

Biography
Leigh obtained his B.Sc. degree from the University of Guelph in 1986, and his Ph.D. from the University of Texas at Austin in 1991, working with Joe Polchinski. After postdoctoral positions at Santa Cruz and Rutgers, he has been a professor at the University of Illinois at Urbana-Champaign since 1996. Since 2007, he has been a Fellow of the American Physical Society.

Leigh discovered, in association with Dai and Polchinski, an important class of extended objects in string theory, the D-branes.

References

External links
Home page

1964 births
Living people
Canadian string theorists
Fellows of the American Physical Society
University of Guelph alumni
University of Texas at Austin College of Natural Sciences alumni
University of Illinois Urbana-Champaign faculty